The  Agua Caliente Mountains are a small range in eastern Yuma and western Maricopa counties in southwest Arizona. The community of Hyder is on the north side of the range adjacent to the Union Pacific rail line and Hyder Road. The community of Agua Caliente lies on the south flank of the range and the Gila River lies to the south.

References

Mountain ranges of Maricopa County, Arizona
Mountain ranges of Yuma County, Arizona